Tadao Beppu (March 26, 1919 – July 22, 1993) was an American politician and businessman.

Born in Maui County, Hawaii, to Japanese immigrant parents, Beppu graduated from University of Hawaii and went to graduate school at Northwestern University. During World War II, Beppu served in the United States Army in Europe. After the war, Beppu was involved with the real estate business. In 1958, Beppu served in the Hawaii Territorial House of Representatives and was a Democrat. From 1959 to 1976, Beppu served in the Hawaii House of Representatives and was speaker of the house from 1968 to 1974. He also served as secretary of the Hawaii Constitutional Convention of 1968. After he left the Hawaii Legislature, Beppu served as deputy director of the Hawaii Department of Health.

Notes 

1919 births
1993 deaths
People from Maui County, Hawaii
Northwestern University alumni
University of Hawaiʻi alumni
United States Army personnel of World War II
American real estate businesspeople
Members of the Hawaii Territorial Legislature
Military personnel from Hawaii
20th-century American politicians
20th-century American businesspeople
Democratic Party members of the Hawaii House of Representatives
Hawaii politicians of Japanese descent
American military personnel of Japanese descent